Platyptilia gandaki is a moth of the family Pterophoridae. It is found in China.

The wingspan is 21–22 mm.

References

Moths described in 1999
gandaki
Endemic fauna of China